Chizhou or Chi Prefecture was a zhou (prefecture) in imperial China, centering on modern Chizhou, Anhui, China. It existed (intermittently) from 621 until 1277.

The modern prefectural-level city Chizhou, created in 2000, retains its name.

Counties
Chi Prefecture administered the following counties through history:

References

 
 
 

Prefectures of the Tang dynasty
Prefectures of Yang Wu
Prefectures of Southern Tang
Prefectures of the Song dynasty
Former prefectures in Anhui
Chizhou
621 establishments
7th-century establishments in China
1277 disestablishments in Asia
13th-century disestablishments in China